Philip Mastin (May 27, 1930 – November 28, 2012) was an American politician.

Mastin served as a Democrat in the Michigan House of Representatives' 69th District and then in the Michigan State Senate's 8th District. He was removed from his state senate seat after losing a recall election in 1984, becoming the first Michigan state legislator to be successfully recalled. 

During his 25 years in Michigan government, he also served as Hazel Park City Councilman, Oakland County supervisor, Oakland County commissioner, deputy chairman and treasurer of the Oakland County Democratic Party, Pontiac city manager, and director of the Downtown Development Authority in Pontiac. He served for two terms as President of the Mental Health Association in Michigan (1987-1988) and was a member of the state association's Board of Directors from 1977 and was elected an "Honorary Board Member" in 2000. Additionally, he served on the National Mental Health Association's Executive Committee as well as their Board of Directors from (1989-1995). He was elected to the Board of the United Way of Michigan in 1996, serving on the Executive Committee and as Chairman of the state agency's Public Policy Committee. He finally retired in 1994.

Before his death, he and his wife, Donna, were members of Fenton First United Methodist Church. Phil served as president of his church golf league and served for 10 years as a member of his condominium association's advisory committee.

Notes

1930 births
2012 deaths
Democratic Party members of the Michigan House of Representatives
Democratic Party Michigan state senators
Recalled state legislators of the United States